RLSY College, Bakhtiyarpur also known as Ram Lakhan Singh Yadav College is a degree college in Bihar, India. It is a constituent unit of Patliputra University.
The college offers Senior secondary education and Undergraduate degree in arts, science and conducts some vocational courses.

History 
The college was established in 1964. It became a constituent unit of Patliputra University in 2018.

Degrees and courses 
The college offers the following degrees and courses.

 Senior Secondary
 Intermediate of Arts
 Intermediate of Science
 Bachelor's degree
 Bachelor of Arts
 Bachelor of Science
 Vocational courses
 Bachelor of Computer Application
 Bachelor of Business Administration

References

External links 

 Official website of college
 Patliputra University website

Constituent colleges of Patliputra University
Educational institutions established in 1964
Universities and colleges in Patna
1964 establishments in Bihar